Hypaball is a computer game for the Commodore 64 based on a fictitious, futuristic sport and published by Odin Computer Graphics 1986. It was programmed and designed by Marc Dawson with graphics by Andy Rixon and music by Keith Tinman. A ZX Spectrum version followed in 1987, ported by Bernie Duggs.

Gameplay
There can be up to three team members that include two strikers and one grounder. The goal of the game is to hit the moving target in the middle, and the ball cannot be held for more than two seconds. The game moves fast, and it is a more modern version of the game Pong.

References

External links

1986 video games
Volleyball video games
Commodore 64 games
Video games developed in the United Kingdom
ZX Spectrum games